M. R. Ramakrishna Panikkar (22 March 1935 – 31 March 2008), popularly known as Kadammanitta Ramakrishnan  or Kadammanitta, was an Indian poet. He was born in Kadammanitta province of Pathanamthitta district, Kerala. His childhood experiences, especially the Patayani songs, had a strong influence on his literary work.

Early life
Ramakrishnan was born on 22 March 1935 to Meletharayil Raman Nair and Kuttiyamma. He completed schooling at his home village of Kadammanitta and at the nearby town of Pathanamthitta. He was influenced by the traditional religious art form of Patayani even from his childhood. After his degree studies, he went to Kolkata and then reached Chennai. He was employed with the Postal Audits and Accounts department in 1959. He worked in Thiruvananthapuram from 1967 until his retirement in 1992.

Literary life
Ramakrishnan's poem Njan was published in 1965 in M. Govindan's Sameeksha magazine.

Kadammanitta played a role in reviving interest in poetry by holding thousands of recital sessions in every nook and corner of Kerala in the 1970s and 80s. His work has been widely appreciated for its force, energy, and folk touch, and his work gave a mass appeal and popularity making poetry enjoyable even to commonman. Ramakrishnan's close association with literary and cultural luminaries, which included M. Govindan, Ayyappa Paniker, M. V. Devan, P. K. Balakrishnan, O. N. V. Kurup, Kavalam Narayana Panicker, D.Vinayachandran, and K. V. Thampi, helped him in the endeavour to give a popular image to Malayalam poetry recital. He had recited his fiery works at thousands of venues all over the state, besides editing a poetry journal Kerala Kavitha that attempted to take the essence of poetry from the academic cloisters to the realms of everyday life.

Other activities
A communist, he was involved with the student federation as well as communist party during his college days. In 1992, he became the vice president of CPI-M's cultural wing, Purogamana Kala Sahitya Sangham (Progressive Association for Art and Letters), and in 2002 its president. In 1996, he was elected to Kerala state legislative assembly from Aranmula constituency in Pathanamthitta district. He was still continuing as the President of Purogamana Kala Sahithya Sangham when he died.

Death
Ramakrishnan died at 9 o'clock in the morning of 31 March 2008 at M.G.M. Memorial Medical Centre in Pathanamthitta, nine days after celebrating his 73rd birthday. He had been undergoing treatment for myeloid leukaemia for the past three months. He was survived by his wife, Santha, daughter, Geetha Devi, and son, Geetha Krishnan. He was cremated with full state honours at the premises of his home in his birth village, after which he was called more.

Major works

 Kurathi
 Kadinjool Pottan
 Misrathalam
 Mazha Peyyunnu Maddhalam Kottunnu
 Kadammanittayude Kavithakal
 Vellivelicham
 Sooryasila
 Shantha
 Kuppayilundoru Maanikyam
 Ee Poochayaanente Dukham
 Kunje Mulappaal Kudikkaruth

Awards

 Kerala Sahithya Akademi Award 1982 (Kadammanittayude Kavithakal)
 Asan Prize 1995 (Kadammanittayude Kavithakal)
 Abu Dhabi Malayalam Samajam Award
 New York Malayalam International Foundation Award
 Muscat Kerala Samskarika Kendram Award
 Basheer Puraskaram (2004)
 Mahakavi Pandalam Keralavarma Poetry Award(2006)

See also
 Kadammanitta Ramakrishnan Award

References

External links
 Kadammanitta Foundation

Malayalam-language writers
Malayalam poets
People from Pathanamthitta
1935 births
2008 deaths
Recipients of the Kerala Sahitya Akademi Award
20th-century Indian poets
Kerala MLAs 1996–2001
Indian male poets
Poets from Kerala
Deaths from cancer in India
People from Aranmula
20th-century Indian male writers